Wally Meehan is a former association football player who represented New Zealand at international level.

Meehan made his full New Zealand debut in a 0–2 loss to New Caledonia on 19 September 1951 and ended his international playing career with four official A-international caps to his credit, his final appearance in a 3–1 win over New Caledonia on 30 September 1951.

References 

Year of birth missing (living people)
Living people
New Zealand association footballers
New Zealand international footballers
Association football central defenders